Työmies was a Finnish brand of cigarettes, which was owned and manufactured by the "Tupakkatehdas Fennia" ("Fennia Tobacco Factory"). "Työmies" is Finnish for "worker" or "working man".

Työmies was a filterless cigarette, which means it had a hollow paper cone that was open at the ends. In order to reduce the risk of tobacco spilling in the mouth, a short wooden cigarette holder that came with the package had to be attached to the cigarette. If the holder was lost, the cone could be flattened or blocked with cotton wool. Amongst the people, Työmies, Klubi, and other spin-wraps were called "pillitupakki" or "pöllitupakki".

History 
The Greek businessman Achilles Kyriako Christides founded Fennia in 1899 and started manufacturing the Työmies cigarette in 1902. The brand was so popular that Fennia soon focused exclusively on its manufacture. In 1913 the factory moved to a building designed by architect Valter Jung and Emil Fabritius in the Koskikara block at the corner of Ruoholahdenkatu and Köydenpunojankatu streets in Helsinki. Finland's coat of arms, a lion with a sword, was printed on the boxes of the Työmies cigarettes.

Työmies, which was now known as "the people's cigarette" was marketed, amongst other things, as an economic one: "Smoking Työmies cigarettes is economical as, in terms of tobacco quantity, a box of Työmies cigarettes is equal to 2–3 boxes of cigarettes with a paper holder." (Finnish Social Democrat, May 1932) Various posters for this brand were also made during the 1930s.

In the fall of 1945, when the luxury supplies were put on ration stamps, a woodcutter who cut four stacked cubic meters of logs was able to buy a "logging site power pack" containing coffee, sugar and Työmies cigarettes. Boxes of Työmies cigarettes were also part of the food parcels given to Finnish soldiers fighting the Russian efforts to seize Finland during World War II.

Especially through the 1952 Summer Olympics in Helsinki, foreign cigarette brands arrived in Finland and the domestic production slowed down. Työmies were manufactured for decades up to 1984 when the Medicines Board prohibited its production as such because of the high levels of tar and nicotine. An advertisement from 1960 describes the Workman's Cigarette like this: "A manly man's stout cigarette. A working man's cigarette is always full of tobacco. Burns only when you want it to."

See also 

 Tobacco smoking

References 

Cigarette brands
Finnish brands